Gregory Walcott (born Bernard Wasdon Mattox, January 13, 1928 – March 20, 2015) was an American television and film actor. Although he had roles in many Hollywood films and television series, he is perhaps best known for having appeared in the 1994 film Ed Wood and Wood's Plan 9 from Outer Space from 1957.

Early years
Walcott was born Bernard Wasdon Mattox in Wendell, North Carolina, on January 13, 1928. He was raised in Wilson, North Carolina. Walcott served in the United States Army towards the end of World War II and the Korean War.

Career 
While serving in the United States Army, Walcott appeared as a marine corps drill instructor in the film Battle Cry (1955), then as a shore patrolman in 1955's war-themed classic Mister Roberts, again as a marine corps drill instructor in The Outsider (1961), and later in Midway (1976) as Capt. Elliott Buckmaster.

He appeared in Western films, beginning with an uncredited role in Red Skies of Montana (1952), then later more prominently as a gunslinger who tries to romance Claudette Colbert in 1955's Texas Lady.

Walcott had roles in many television series, including that of Stone Kenyon in two episodes of the NBC sitcom, The People's Choice with Jackie Cooper. He was frequently cast in westerns like Bonanza (seven times), Maverick, Frontier Doctor, Wagon Train, The High Chaparral, 26 Men, Sugarfoot (in the 1958 episode "Bullet Proof"), Laramie, The Rifleman, The Tall Man, The Dakotas, and in several episodes of CBS's Rawhide,  through which he began a long collaboration with Clint Eastwood. Walcott had featured roles in Eastwood's films Joe Kidd (1972), Thunderbolt and Lightfoot (1974), The Eiger Sanction (1975), and Every Which Way But Loose (1978).

Walcott made a guest appearance on Perry Mason as Bill Johnson in the 1959 episode, "The Case of the Howling Dog." He also was one of the stars of a 1961–1962 NBC television series, 87th Precinct, as Detective Roger Havilland. Walcott had guest roles on other television series, such as CHIPS and CBS's Dennis the Menace. He had  recurring roles too in the original Dallas and Murder, She Wrote, and he appeared as Captain Diggs on the 1970s series Land of the Lost. He also made a guest appearance in 1984 on the TV series Alice  in the episode titled "House Full of Hunnicutts".  He played Jolene Hunnicutt's father, Big Jake Hunnicutt.

His theatrical film work included the comedy On the Double (1961), Captain Newman, M.D. (1963), Prime Cut (1972), The Last American Hero (1973), and the chase film The Sugarland Express (1974). Walcott played a sheriff in the 1979 film Norma Rae, and appeared in the film Tilt the same year. He made a cameo appearance in the 1994 Ed Wood bio-pic starring Johnny Depp, directed by Tim Burton, which was Walcott's final role.

Walcott long regretted having anything to do with Plan 9, but in a September 10, 2000, Los Angeles Times interview, he said, "It's better to be remembered for something than for nothing, don't you think?"

Personal life and death
Walcott married Barbara May Watkins, and they had a son and two daughters. They were married for 55 years until her death in 2010. He died of natural causes on March 20, 2015, in his home in Canoga Park,  California, aged 87. He was buried in Oakwood Memorial Park Cemetery in Chatsworth, California, beside his wife, under his given name Bernard Mattox.

Filmography

References

External links

1928 births
2015 deaths
Male actors from North Carolina
American male film actors
American male television actors
People from Wilson, North Carolina
United States Army soldiers
Male actors from Los Angeles
20th-century American male actors
American Presbyterians
Western (genre) television actors
People from Wendell, North Carolina
Male Western (genre) film actors